Roughlock Falls Nature Area is a nature area in Lawrence County, South Dakota in the United States. It is located in Spearfish Canyon, near Little Spearfish Creek, just before the creek joins Spearfish Creek, within the Black Hills National Forest. The area is managed by the South Dakota Department of Game, Fish, and Parks. Birdwatching, fishing, hiking, and snowmobiling are popular activities within this area. The area is about 15 miles southwest of Spearfish or about 14.5 miles west of Lead, just west of Spearfish Canyon Scenic Byway (U.S. 14A).

Wildlife found in the area include: Elk, Bald eagle, White-tailed deer, Mule deer, Coyote, Beaver, Bighorn sheep, Mountain goat, and Mountain lion.

See also
Spearfish Canyon
Black Hills
Black Hills Gold Rush
Homestake Mine

References

External links
 
 Black Hills National Forest - Spearfish Ranger District

Black Hills
Protected areas of Lawrence County, South Dakota
Protected areas of South Dakota
State parks of South Dakota
Black Hills National Forest
Protected areas established in 2008
2008 establishments in South Dakota